The Rosie Hospital is a maternity hospital in Cambridge. It is managed by the Cambridge University Hospitals NHS Foundation Trust.

History
The facility originates from the Central Union Poor House Infirmary which was established on Mill Road in the 19th century. This establishment became the County Municipal Infirmary in 1930, developed into a maternity hospital in the 1940s and then joined the National Health Service as the Mill Road Maternity Hospital in 1948.

A new purpose-built facility, established with a significant donation from local philanthropist David Robinson and named after his mother, was opened on Addenbrooke's Hospital's Hills Road site in October 1983. A major expansion of the Rosie Hospital was opened by the Queen and the Duke of Edinburgh in May 2013 and 5,000 babies had been born there by November 2016.

Services
The facility is located adjacent to Addenbrooke's Hospital and contains 120 maternity and women's beds. It has its own theatre suite, fetal assessment unit, ultrasound department, and neonatal intensive care unit. It is the regional centre of excellence for maternity care.

See also
 Healthcare in Cambridgeshire
 List of hospitals in England
 Portland Hospital
 Queen Charlotte's and Chelsea Hospital

References

External links
 
 University of Cambridge pages about the Addenbrooke's site
 The Medical School
 Addenbrooke's Charitable Trust (ACT)

Maternity hospitals in the United Kingdom
Hospitals in Cambridgeshire
Hospital buildings completed in 1983
Buildings and structures in Cambridge
NHS hospitals in England

Teaching hospitals in England